Three Can Play That Game is a 2007 romantic comedy film directed by Samad Davis and starring Jason George, Jazsmin Lewis, and Vivica A. Fox. It is a sequel to the 2001 film Two Can Play That Game.

Plot
When Byron (George) hits the big time, no one is happier than his girlfriend Tiffany (Lewis) - that is, until she catches him flirting with his sly new project manager Carla (Kellita Smith). While contemplating whether to break it off with Byron, Tiffany's best friend tells her about a specialist for women whose men can not control their primitive urges. Enter Ms. Shanté Smith (Fox). Using her knowledge of the male psyche and her new Five Step program, Shanté gives Tiffany the necessary tools she needs to "train" Byron and teach him a lesson for his behavior. However, Byron also has expert advice in his corner, courtesy of his best friend Gizzard (Tony Rock).  Once again, the battle for the title of the superior sex is on.

Cast
 Vivica A. Fox — Shanté Smith
 Donna Biscoe — Mrs. Thompson
 Jazsmin Lewis — Tiffany
 Jason George — Byron Thompson
 John Atwood — Dexter McKinzie
 Kellita Smith — Carla
 Liz Langford — Karen Thompson
 L. Warren Young — Mr. Thompson
 Melyssa Ford — Candy
 Rashan Ali — Monica
 Terri J. Vaughn — Linda
 Tony Rock — Gizzard

External links
 
 

2007 films
African-American films
American romantic comedy films
2007 romantic comedy films
Films produced by Will Packer
Rainforest Films films
Stage 6 Films films
Screen Gems films
2000s English-language films
2000s American films